Professor Antony Clifford Dornhorst CBE, FRCP (1915–2003) was a British physician and medical educator, described by The Guardian as "one of the outstanding academic clinician-scientists of his generation".

Dornhorst was born on 2 April 1915 in Woodford, Essex. His father was a company director of Dutch descent; his mother a musician.

He was educated at St Clement Danes School, but did not attend school between the ages of 12 and 14. He subsequently studied medicine at St Thomas's Hospital Medical School. At the age of 23, he became the youngest ever member of the Royal College of Physicians.

He served with the Royal Army Medical Corps in World War II, in Palestine, north Africa, Italy, and as the senior physician in Berlin, with the rank of lieutenant colonel. It was in Berlin that he met Helen, a Royal Army Medical Corps radiologist, who was to become his wife.

He was appointed a reader in medicine at St Thomas's in 1949 and became a consultant there in 1951.

He held the foundation chair of medicine at St George's Hospital Medical School from 1959 to 1980.

Serving on the Himsworth committee on matters relating to Northern Ireland, he once inhaled CS gas to better understand its effects.

He was a member of the Medical Research Council from 1973 to 1977.

He was made a Commander of the Order of British Empire (CBE) in 1977, as part of the Silver Jubilee and Birthday Honours.

He died on 9 March 2003.

References

External links 

 

1915 births
2003 deaths
Place of death missing
20th-century British medical doctors
People educated at St. Clement Danes School
Royal Army Medical Corps officers
British Army personnel of World War II
Alumni of St Thomas's Hospital Medical School
Commanders of the Order of the British Empire
British medical researchers